Kristie Boogert and Jana Novotná were the defending champions but they competed with different partners that year, Boogert with Irina Spîrlea and Novotná with Martina Hingis.

Boogert and Spîrlea lost in the first round to Sabine Appelmans and Miriam Oremans.

Hingis and Novotná won in the final 6–3, 6–0 against Alexandra Fusai and Rita Grande.

Seeds
Champion seeds are indicated in bold text while text in italics indicates the round in which those seeds were eliminated.

 Martina Hingis /  Jana Novotná (champions)
 Larisa Savchenko /  Nathalie Tauziat (quarterfinals)
 Nicole Arendt /  Manon Bollegraf (first round)
 Yayuk Basuki /  Caroline Vis (quarterfinals)

Draw

External links
 1997 Open Gaz de France Doubles Draw

Open GDF Suez
1997 WTA Tour